The 1986–87 Syracuse Orangemen basketball team represented Syracuse University in the 1986–87 NCAA Division I men's basketball season.  The Head coach was Jim Boeheim, serving for his 11th year.  The team played home games at the Carrier Dome in Syracuse, New York.  The team finished with a 31-7 (12-4) record while making it to the Championship game of the NCAA tournament.

The team was led by junior Rony Seikaly and sophomore Sherman Douglas.  Seniors Greg Monroe and Howard Triche, and freshman Derrick Coleman also played key roles.

Season recap
After the graduation of Rafael Addison and Wendell Alexis and the early departure of Dwayne Washington, expectations for the season were low.

But behind the surprising Sherman Douglas and Derrick Coleman, and despite an early injury to Rony Seikaly, Syracuse won its first 15 games en route to winning the Big East regular season title. The season included thrilling victories over St. Johns (64-63) and Seton Hall (84-80).

Syracuse would defeat Villanova and Pittsburgh to advance to the Big East Championship game before falling to Georgetown, 69-59.

NCAA tournament

After finishing the regular season at 28-6, the Orangemen earned a 2 seed in the East region of the NCAA tournament.

Syracuse played its first two tournament games at home in the Carrier Dome.  The Orangemen defeated 15 seed Georgia Southern 79-73 and 10 seed Western Kentucky 104-86 to advance to the Sweet 16.

After winning its first two tournament games at the Carrier Dome, the Orangemen moved on to the Sweet 16  held at The Meadowlands in East Rutherford, New Jersey.  The Orangemen defeated 6 seed Florida 87-81.

Syracuse faced 1 seed North Carolina in the regional finals.  The Orangemen had to fight off the Tar Heels down the stretch as they fought to overcome a 15 point Syracuse lead.  However, Syracuse was able to hold off the Tar Heels, winning 79-75 to advance to the Final Four.

In the semi-final game, the Orangemen defeated fellow Big East team and 6 seed Providence 77-63.  The Orangemen had an easy time with the Friars, out rebounding them 53-35 with Coleman, Douglas, and Triche each having at least 10 rebounds.  The Orangemen held the Friars to 36.4% shooting leading Coach Boeheim to credit the team's defense for the win.  The Orangemen also held Providence's leading scorer and future Florida Gators head coach Billy Donovan to 8 points, 18 under his season average.

In the championship game at the Superdome in New Orleans, Louisiana, the Orangemen matched up against the Indiana Hoosiers coached by Bobby Knight. The game was a back and forth battle down until the final whistle.  The Orangemen had a one point lead with 28 seconds left in the second half when Coleman missed the front end of a one and one.  Indiana grabbed the rebound and tournament MOP Keith Smart made a jumper from the corner with just seconds left on the clock to give the Hoosiers a one point lead and the National Championship.

NCAA Tournament school records

The team's 104 point outburst against Western Kentucky in the second round is tied for the most points in a tournament game.

Rony Seikaly's 138 points is a school record and was tied with Indiana's Steve Alford for most in that year's tournament.  He also set records for field goals and free throws made with 53 and 51, respectively.

Derrick Coleman's 19 rebounds against Indiana is a school record that still stands as of 2008.  He also set tournament records for rebounds and blocked shots with 73 and 16, respectively.

Sherman Douglas set a record for assists with 49.

Roster

Schedule and results

|-
!colspan=9 style=| Non-conference Regular season

|-
!colspan=9 style=| Big East Regular season

|-
!colspan=9 style=| Big East Tournament

|-
!colspan=9 style=| NCAA Tournament

Rankings

References

Syracuse Orange
Syracuse Orange men's basketball seasons
NCAA Division I men's basketball tournament Final Four seasons
Syracuse
Syracuse Orange
Syracuse Orange